La Blanchisseuse (The Laundress) is an 1886 oil-on-canvas painting by French artist Henri de Toulouse-Lautrec. In November 2005, it was sold for 22.4 million dollars at auction by Christie's. The subject of laundresses, also known as washerwomen, was a popular one in art, especially in France.

La Blanchisseuse was painted by Toulouse-Lautrec and posed for by the sex worker Carmen Gaudin in 1886. This painting showcases the gritty life and working conditions endured by the working classes throughout the 19th century. The painting was in storage until 2005, when an anonymous buyer acquired it for 22.4 million dollars, breaking the record for the most expensive Lautrec painting sold at an auction.

Toulouse-Lautrec's life was altered at an early age by disability: he fractured his right femur at the age of 13, and his left at the age of 14. This made him unable to participate in the usual activities of men his age, so he took up an interest in art and illustrations. His legs never grew properly after that, producing a  adult. Despite his disability and a career lasting only 20 years, he created 737 canvassed paintings, 275 watercolors, 363 prints and posters for the Moulin Rouge and a number of carnivals, 5,084 drawings, and an unknown number of lost works throughout his career. He died at the age of 36. In spite of his early death, he made a name for himself among the Post-Impressionist artists.

References

1886 paintings
Paintings by Henri de Toulouse-Lautrec